The City War Memorial, Nottingham, also known as the Nottingham Municipal War Memorial and the City of Nottingham War Memorial, is the main war memorial for the city of Nottingham in England.  It comprises a memorial arch of Portland stone with three openings and wrought iron gates, and stone flanking arcades.  It was unveiled in 1927 beside a new park overlooking the River Trent, and became a Grade II listed building in 1972.

Background
The Lord Lieutenant of Nottingham (William Cavendish-Bentinck, 6th Duke of Portland) and the Mayor of Nottingham convened a public meeting in 1919 to discuss proposals for a city war memorial, to commemorate around 40,000 men from Nottinghamshire who served in the British armed forces during the First World War, around 10,000 of whom were killed.  Suggestions included building a university, expanding the city's general hospital, an ex-serviceman's organisation, memorial homes, a campanile, a sculpture, or an architectural monument.

A public appeal sought £100,000 for Nottingham General Hospital, of which £90,000 was funded by two people, Sir Jesse Boot and William Goodacre Player, from the local businesses Boots the Chemist and John Player & Sons.  A further £20,000 was sought for a monument in Nottingham's Market Square, but by 1920 the proposal shifted after Sir Jesse Boot donated an area of land for the monument on Trentside, to the south of the city centre.  Overcoming complaints that the money would be better spent on supporting servicemen and their dependents, the city council announced in October 1922 that the land would become a  public park with a memorial gateway.  The project was estimated to cost £70,000, with £50,000 to be funded by a loan from the Ministry of Health.  Further funds came from the Ministry of Labour's Unemployment Grants Committee to engage unemployed men to do some of the work.

The memorial was designed by Thomas Wallis Gordon, Nottingham City Engineer and Surveyor for Nottingham Corporation from 1896 until 1935.

Description
The columns frame three openings, each of which has a pair of wrought iron gates and fixed lunette.

Carved into the stone above the side arches are the dates "1914-1918" (left) and "1939-1945" (right). The frieze above the central arch is inscribed with the Latin motto from the City's coat of arms, "VIVIT POST FUNERA VIRTUS", which may be loosely translated as "virtue outlives death", above which there is a carving of the city's coat of arms on the parapet. The interior walls of the archway have bronze plaques with inscriptions, including one inscribed with the words of tribute that the French Marshal Foch gave to the Sherwood Foresters in 1918.

As originally built, steps aligned with the central arch led down to the west bank of the River Trent, but the steps were moved after the Second World War. The central arch is still aligned with an ornamental pond in the memorial gardens to the west.

History
The memorial was installed on the east side of a new Memorial Garden (now also grade II listed) to the south of the Meadows, on Victoria Embankment beside the River Trent, facing towards West Bridgford on the opposite bank.  The foundation stone was laid by Edward, Prince of Wales (later Edward VIII), on 1 August 1923.  After delays attributed to the extensive groundworks, the memorial was unveiled by Edmund Huntsman, Mayor of Nottingham, on 11 November 1927.  The service of dedication was carried out by James Gordon, then Vicar of St Mary's Church, Nottingham.  The ceremony was attended by a crowd of several thousand people with a parade by the Robin Hood Battalion (7th Battalion, Sherwood Foresters).

The memorial was later adapted to commemorate those people who died in the Second World War.  It was listed at Grade II in 1972.

Great War Memorial 
The Great War Memorial was commissioned by Nottingham City Council and Nottinghamshire County Council, in collaboration with the district and borough councils of Ashfield, Bassetlaw, Broxtowe, Gedling, Mansfield, Newark and Sherwood, and Rushcliffe.

See also
Arch of Remembrance, another war memorial arch in the nearby city of Leicester

Notes

References

 Nottingham Municipal War Memorial, National Heritage List for England, Historic England
 City of Nottingham War Memorial, War Memorials Online
 Nottingham memorial, War Memorials Register, Imperial War Museums
 The Great War memorial, Unveiling event, Nottinghamshire County Council
 Duke of Kent officially opens stunning First World War memorial at Victoria Embankment", Nottingham Post, 28 June 2019
 WWI War Memorial, Victoria Embankment, Nottingham, Bonsers Restoration
 Great War Memorial, Nottingham, Albion Stone

City War
British military memorials and cemeteries
Monuments and memorials in Nottinghamshire